This is a ranking list of Israeli wealthy people. The following is based on the annual estimated wealth and assets assessment compiled and published by American business magazine Forbes. The wealth of 30 people exceeds $1billion. Forbes does not include in the list all entrepreneurs and investors who have citizenship of the country. 

According to Israeli daily business newspaper TheMarker, Israel has seventy-one billionaires as of 2021, with one of the highest per capita rates in the world, at 6.7 billionaires for every million people. However, not all of them permanently reside in Israel. In shekel (₪) terms, Israel had 170 billionaires in the same year. Forbes also lists Israeli citizens living in other countries on its list.

Methodology
Each year, Forbes employs a team of more than 50 reporters from a variety of countries to track the activity of the world's wealthiest individuals. Preliminary surveys are sent to those who may qualify for the list. According to Forbes, they received three types of responses—some people try to inflate their wealth, others cooperate but leave out details, and some refuse to answer any questions. Business deals are then scrutinized and estimates of valuable assets (land, homes, vehicles, artwork, etc.) are made. Interviews are conducted to vet the figures and improve the estimate of an individual's holdings. Finally, positions in a publicly traded stock are priced to market on a date roughly a month before publication. Privately held companies are priced by the prevailing price-to-sales or price-to-earnings ratios. Known debt is subtracted from assets to get a final estimate of an individual's estimated worth in United States dollars. Since stock prices fluctuate rapidly, an individual's true wealth and ranking at the time of publication may vary from their situation when the list was compiled.

Family fortunes dispersed over a large number of relatives are included only if those individuals' holdings are worth more than a billion dollars. However, when a living individual has dispersed his or her wealth to immediate family members, it is included under a single listing provided that individual is still living. Royal families and dictators that have their wealth contingent on a position are always excluded from these lists.

2022 list
The thirty billionaires are listed as follows, including their Israel rank (R#) and world rank (W#), citizenship, age, net worth, and source of wealth:

References

External links

See also
 Forbes list of billionaires
 List of countries by the number of billionaires

Lists of people by wealth

Wealth in Israel
Net worth
Economy of Israel-related lists